Choi Kwang (born September 1, 1947) is a South Korean economist who specialises in public sector economics. He served as the Minister of Health and Welfare during the presidency of Kim Young-sam.

Early life
Choi was born in Namhae, South Gyeongsang Province. He received his B.A. in Business Administration from Seoul National University before moving to the United States, where he earned an M.A. in Public Policy at the University of Wisconsin–Madison and a Ph.D. in Economics at the University of Maryland.

Career
Choi served as an economics professor at the University of Wyoming in the United States and at the Hankuk University of Foreign Studies, as the President of the Korea Institute of Public Finance, and as Chief of National Assembly Budget Office.

In May 2013, Choi was named Chairman and Chief Executive Officer of South Korea's National Pension Service (NPS). The NPS has ₩420 trillion (US$400 billion) in assets under management, making it one of the world's top four pension funds in terms of total assets.

References

External links
National Pension Service, South Korea

1947 births
Living people
Kwang
20th-century South Korean economists
Health and Welfare ministers of South Korea
Seoul National University alumni
 Robert M. La Follette School of Public Affairs alumni
University of Maryland, College Park alumni
People from South Gyeongsang Province
21st-century South Korean economists